Estakhr Sar is a village in Farim Rural District, Dodangeh District, Sari County, Mazandaran Province, Iran. At the 2006 census, its population was 76, in 18 families.

References 

Populated places in Sari County